Ophryocystis elektroscirrha (sometimes abbreviated OE or O.e.) is an obligate, neogregarine protozoan parasite that infects monarch (Danaus plexippus) and queen (Danaus gilippus) butterflies. There are no other known hosts. The species was first discovered in Florida, around the late 1960s. Since then, it has been found in every monarch population examined to date, including monarchs sampled in North America, Hawaii, Australia, Cuba, and Central and South America.

Dormant spores occur on the cuticles of butterflies, in between the butterfly's scales. They are small, brown or black objects about 1/100th the width of a butterfly scale.

The only currently known way of treating the Ophryocystis parasite is by soaking the host's eggs in a light bleach solution, which kills the spores that are present on the eggs' surface.

Life cycle
Ophryocystis elektroscirrha is usually transmitted from females to their offspring when the females scatter spores on their egg chorions and surfaces of milkweed leaves, the host plant of monarchs and queens, during oviposition (egg laying). Male butterflies can also have O.e. disease, and will scatter the dormant spores onto Milkweed leaves as they fly around, and can scatter spores onto a female butterfly during mating. The female that has spores scattered onto her during mating does not have the disease, but now can scatter those dormant spores onto the eggs she lays or onto Milkweed leaves. Milkweeds contains toxins that partially protect monarch larvae. The spores are ingested by the larvae. After they enter a host's gut, the spores open and emerging sporozoites penetrate a larva's gut wall and migrate to its hypoderm (the layer of cells that secrete the larva's cuticle), where they undergo two phases of vegetative reproduction. After the caterpillar pupates, O. elektroscirrha starts reproducing sexually. Three days before adults emerge, developing parasite spores can be seen through their pupal integuments. The adult butterflies emerge covered with spores, mostly on their abdomens. Parasites do not continue to replicate on adult butterflies and spores must be eaten by larvae before they can cause new infections.

Effects
O. elektroscirrha is geographically widespread, and may have a long history of occurrence with monarch butterflies. Infection by O. elektroscirrha causes monarchs to have lower survival rates. O. elektroscirrha has negative effects on survival and fitness. This is more severe when larvae ingest a larger number of spores, and are infected at earlier instars. Statistically significant infection rates result in abnormal adult eclosion. High infection can result in smaller wingspans and lower weights. Mating success decreases with higher parasite loads and, though females that mate and lay eggs have a shorter lifespan, they have no decrease in egg-laying. Spores are passed from female to caterpillar. Parasite levels vary between geographical populations ranging from 70% to 3%. This is not the case in laboratory rearing, where after a few generations, all individuals can be infected.

Infection with this parasite results in culling. Migrating monarchs that are infected are less likely to complete the migration.  Populations which migrate have lower parasite loads than those which are non-migratory.

Infection rates
The prevalence (proportion of butterflies infected) with O. elektroscirrha is highly variable and it varies inversely with host migration distances. Non-migratory populations can have an infection rate of up to 70%. 30% of the western migratory population are also infected. Less than 8% of monarchs from the eastern migratory population are heavily infected.

References

External links
 Monarch parasites
 study of the effects on butterfly population

Conoidasida